The Brimstone Wedding is a 1996 mystery novel by British writer Ruth Rendell, written under the name Barbara Vine.

Plot summary
Jenny Warden, a care-assistant in a retirement home, is in a loveless marriage, and has a lover. She befriends Stella Newland, a resident with terminal cancer, and Stella gradually reveals the events of her life, which in some ways parallel Jenny's. A vanished film star and a secret house add to the intrigue until the terrible truth of the brimstone wedding is finally revealed.

References

1996 British novels
Novels by Ruth Rendell
Works published under a pseudonym
Viking Press books